Sapan Saxena (born April 5, 1985) is an Indian author, best known for his novels Finders, Keepers, UNNS-The Captivation and The Tenth Riddle

Early life and education

Sapan was born on April 5, 1985 at Kanpur in Uttar Pradesh. His father, Umesh, is a senior bank officer with UCO Bank. He did his Engineering from Motilal Nehru National Institute of Technology Allahabad

Sapan started writing blogs in the year 2011 and his blog was covered by national mainstream media outlets like The Times of India on a couple of occasions.

He often credits his father and the readers of his blog for pushing him into the world of fiction novels

Career

As Software Engineer 
He has worked for 14 years in the software industry and currently works with UKG

As an author 
Sapan then started working on his novel Finders, Keepers which was launched in January 2015 at Bhubaneshwar. The launch as covered by The New Indian Express and was attended by Padma Shri Prafulla Kar and eminent novelist Santanu Kumar Acharya and noted ghazal singer Subhashish Panigrahi.

The book had another launch at Motilal Nehru National Institute of Technology during the National level cultural festival of the college, Culrav which was attended by Shri Girdhar Malviya.

The Delhi launch of the book was attended by Bharatiya Janta Party MP from Meerut, Shri Rajendra Agrawal. The Hindu covered the book in its Friday Fever section.

The book received mostly positive reviews from eminent journalists and reviewers.

Samata Dey from IndiaCafe said "Sapan offered a very interesting story, where not only the plot but the atmosphere and the scenario the plot is based in, becomes the primal focus too. Some simple yet very confusing questions are asked in the different parts of the book which are related to the famous historical figures which is mind boggling".

Sapan's 2nd novel's launch was covered by Chandigarh chapter of Indian Express and Dainik Bhaskar. UNNS- The Captivation is published by Inspire India publishers.

Sapan mentions "The book is a romantic espionage thriller with a basic theme of the Sufi-inspired seven stages of love" when asked about the book. He claims the title UNNS is actually the 2nd stage of love as per Sufi traditions.

In an interview with UC News, Sapan mentions "UNNS is a romantic espionage thriller.". In another interview with The News Now, he calls the book "A story with a lot of depth and a lot of heart." Sapan also mentions in his interview with Hindustan Times that "The story finds inspiration from some stories of that the author witnessed during his education days."

In October 2021, Sapan's third book The Tenth Riddle was released which is "is a murder mystery backed by the core theme of the sacred feminism, the Adishakti". In his interview with the Asian Chronicle, Sapan said "it's a murder mystery and my protagonists excel in the science of deduction, so a lot of lateral thinking has also been used to solve various pieces of the puzzle.".
The Asian Chronicle called the book a "winner" and praised it for its story and suspense.

Awards and recognition 

 Listed among Top-50 Most Influential authors by Delhi Wire (2021)

Bibliography 

 Finders, Keepers  (2015)
 UNNS-The Captivation  (2017)
 The Tenth Riddle (2021)

Rendition of Jabra Fan
In March 2016, Sapan did a homemade rendition of Shah Rukh Khan's then yet to be released movie Fan. The video was released on his YouTube account and was immediately picked up by various media portals

The video was very well received across social media platforms and Shah Rukh Khan used his official Twitter account in praise of the video.

References

1985 births
Living people
Indian male novelists
Novelists from Uttar Pradesh
English-language writers from India
Writers from Lucknow